Wayne Pigram (born 13 October 1959), better known by his stage name Wayne Pygram, is an Australian actor, known for his role as Scorpius in the science fiction series Farscape (2000–2003) and the miniseries that followed, Farscape: The Peacekeeper Wars (2004). He appeared in Star Wars: Episode III – Revenge of the Sith, playing Grand Moff Tarkin, the character which Peter Cushing had played 28 years earlier in A New Hope.

Biography
Pygram was born in Cootamundra, New South Wales and raised in Wagga Wagga, where, as a teen, he was a drummer in a dance group. He initially studied art at Riverina College of Advanced Education, but later changed majors to primary school education.

While in college, Pygram became a member of a theatre troupe known as the Riverina Trucking Company. Before acting in films and television, he was a regular on the Australian theatre circuit.

In 2005, Pygram made a brief cameo in Star Wars: Episode III – Revenge of the Sith as a young Grand Moff Tarkin.

Due to the brevity of his Star Wars cameo, and the makeup he wore on Farscape, Pygram's real face may now be known best for his appearance on the TV show Lost, as a faith healer named Isaac of Uluru.

Pygram has played the drums in numerous bands over the past 20 years, the most recent being a band named Signal Room (formerly called Number 96).

Along with his Farscape co-star Anthony Simcoe, Pygram has been teaching the drums at Kildare Catholic College, an Australian Catholic school based in Wagga Wagga.

Filmography

Film
 Warming Up (1985) – Wombat
 The First Kangaroos (1988) – Abie Rosenfeldt
 Farewell to the King (1989) – Bren Armstrong
 Return to the Blue Lagoon (1991) – Kearney
 Hammers Over the Anvil (1993) – Snarley Burns
 The Custodian (1993) – Det. Massey
 Doing Time for Patsy Cline (1997) – Geoff Spinks
 The Day of the Roses (1998, TV Mini-Series) – Sgt. Joe Beecroft
 Risk (2000) – Mick
 Star Wars: Episode III – Revenge of the Sith (2005) – Wilhuff Tarkin
 Heatstroke (2008) – Mental Blanakoff

Television
 The Last Resort (1988)
 Heroes II: The Return (1991) – Lt Bruno Reymond (Rimau member)
 The Girl From Tomorrow (1992) – Guard
 Fire (1995) – Senior Station Officer Quentin 'Spit' Jacobsen
 Roar (1997) – Goll
 Home and Away (2001–2008) – Ian Woodford / Ian Muir
 Farscape (2000–2003) – Scorpius / Harvey / Jack Crichton
 Heroes' Mountain (2002, TV Movie) – Col Langdon
 Farscape: The Peacekeeper Wars (2004) – Scorpius / Harvey
 Through My Eyes (2004) – Rice
 Lost (2006) – Isaac of Uluru
 Underbelly: The Golden Mile (2010) – Police Commissioner

References

External links
 

1959 births
Australian male film actors
Australian male stage actors
Australian male television actors
Living people
People from Wagga Wagga
Male actors from New South Wales